Nova Maala is a village in the municipality of Vasilevo, North Macedonia. Most of the inhabitants of the village are Macedonian Catholics of Eastern Rite.

Demographics
As of the 2021 census, Nova Maala had 893 residents with the following ethnic composition:
Macedonians 546
Persons for whom data are taken from administrative sources 271
Turks 76

According to the 2002 census, the village had a total of 823 inhabitants. Ethnic groups in the village include:
Macedonians 679
Turks 142
Bosniaks 1
Others 1

References

Villages in Vasilevo Municipality